Miss World 1962, the 12th edition of the Miss World pageant, was held on 8 November 1962 at the Lyceum Ballroom in London, United Kingdom. The winner was Catharina Lodders of Holland. She was crowned by Miss World 1961, Rosemarie Frankland of United Kingdom. Lodders was the second woman from Holland to win Miss World title after Corine Rottschäfer in 1959.

Results

Contestants

  – María Amalia Ramirez
  – Inge Jaklin
  – Christine Delit
  – Vera Lúzia Saba
  – Marlene Leeson
  – Roxsana L.S. Chiang
  – Magda Michailides
  – Rikki Stisager
  – Elaine Ortega Hougen
  – Kaarina Marita Leskinen
  – Monique Lemaire
  – Anita Steffen
  – Glasmine Moraitou
  – Catharina Johanna Lodders 
  – Rannveig Ólafsdóttir
  – Ferial Karim†
  – Muriel O'Hanlon
  – Ilana Porat
  – Raffaella da Carolis
  – Chriss Leon
  – Teruko Ikeda
  – Leila Emile Khadder
  – Chung Tae-ja
  – Brita Gerson
  – Maureen Te Rangi Rere I Waho Kingi †
  – Palmira Ferreira
  – Yvonne Maryann Ficker
  – Conchita Roig Urpi
  – Margareth Melin
  – Jackie White
  – María Noel Genovese
  – Amadee Chabot 
  – Betzabeth Franco Blanco

Judges
The performances of Miss World 1962 contestants were evaluated by a panel of judges, are:
 Lord John Jacob Astor — Anglo-American journalist and owner of The Times of London
 Grace Fields — British actress, singer and comedian
 Leslie McDonnell — Scottish writer (who replaced businessman Billy Butlin at the last minute)
 Bob Hope — American actor and comedian
 Charles Eade — journalist and member of the Council of the Commonwealth Press Union
 Lady Margaret Simons-Kimberley, of the British High Society.
 Robert John Graham Boothby, Baron Boothby — British conservative politician
 Jenifer Unite-Armstrong-Jones — wife of Mayor Ronald Armstrong-Jones
 Richard Todd — Irish-born British film actor

Notes

Returning countries
 Jamaica and Portugal last competed in 1959.
 Canada and Jordan last competed in 1960.

Nations not competing
  – Rosemarie Lederer Aguilera (never arrived)
  – Carolina Nouel (dropped out the day before the finals)
  – María Isabel Maas Uhl (never arrived)
  (did not appear – married instead)

References

External links
 Miss World official website
 Pageantopolis – Miss World 1962

Miss World
1962 in London
1962 beauty pageants
Beauty pageants in the United Kingdom
November 1962 events in the United Kingdom